The lands administrative divisions of Western Australia refer to subdivisions of the state of Western Australia for cadastral (land title) purposes, most of which have been in place since the 19th century. The state is divided up for this purpose into five land divisions, which in turn are subdivided into land districts, which correspond to counties in other Australian states. These districts are then subdivided further into numbered locations, as well as gazetted townsites. Together, they form part of the lands administrative divisions of Australia.

Land divisions 

There are five land divisions in Western Australia, as specified in Schedule 1 of the Land Administration Act 1997.

Eastern Land Division
Eucla Land Division
Kimberley Land Division
North West Land Division
South West Land Division

The Rabbit-proof fence is the border between the North West and South West divisions on the western side, and the others on the eastern side. In practical terms, the divisions are rarely used — in 1897, the Under Secretary for Lands described their purpose as "really only for the purpose of classifying land for Pastoral Leases".

The system of divisions developed as follows:

Land districts 

The land district is the highest level of land division actively used in Western Australian land titles, and has been in use in some form since the earliest days of the Swan River Colony, although only achieved statutory recognition with the enactment of section 7 the Land Act 1898. They are recognised today through section 26 of the Land Administration Act 1997. Under the system in place, there are two methods of distributing titles within a district: one is to gazette a townsite from land within the district and henceforth treat it entirely separately from the district; the other is to create locations (almost always numeric) within districts, such as Windell Location 7 or Swan Location 1315, and then either dedicate the location as a reserve with reference to the Governor's powers under the 1997 Act, grant the location in fee simple to an individual or company, or subdivide it into lots for sale or lease.

History
In 1831, instructions were issued from the Colonial Secretary in London for "the division of the whole of the territory of Western Australia into Counties, Hundreds and Parishes of fixed size". However, the system was all but abandoned within a few years, and district names were simply applied to areas without any effort to fix boundaries for them. Areas within declared townsites were managed separately.

At this time, the population of the colony was small, and the Governor had complete control over the affairs of the state, receiving advice from experts such as the Surveyor General, who was responsible for the Department of Lands and Surveys. In 1890, the colony achieved responsible government, and in 1892–1893, gold was discovered in the Kalgoorlie region, leading to a gold rush. In 1895–1896, the Department, by now quite overwhelmed, attempted to define boundaries for districts based on where land had already been granted, but the result was irregular boundaries which did not follow natural features. Furthermore, in assigning and alienating the land, the Department's officers were in somewhat uncharted territory due to the mix of pre-1890 regulations from the Governor with overly specific statutes from the legislature (such as the Homestead Act 1893 and Transfer of Land Act 1892) that they had to navigate. The Under Secretary for Lands noted in August 1896 that "there is no provision in any Act or Regulations for the declaration of land districts... it is only an office arrangement".

The Surveyor General and his staff agitated for a "Consolidated Land Bill" which would consolidate then repeal all previous arrangements, provide a statutory framework which recognised existing practice, and establish a more formal method for establishing and recording land districts. New broad-acre settlements in areas of the colony not already covered by districts (most notably at Carnarvon and Esperance) made the matter more urgent.

In the interim, the Department started two new files at the beginning of 1897 which ultimately recorded the correspondence between the Chief Draftsman, Surveyor General, Under Secretary for Lands and the responsible Minister in setting up a consistent means of generating and naming new land districts which would form the basis of a statutory system once one emerged, and 25 new districts had been approved by year's end.

On 1 January 1899, the Land Act took effect, and the Department's new system became the norm, with the only change being that all new districts or changes to existing ones were printed in the Government Gazette. Until 1902, with only some exceptions, names used were usually those of explorers or early settlers, but in 1902, the Surveyor General rejected a suggested list of new names, advising the Chief Draftsman that "I should much prefer euphonious native names if they can be obtained for these proposed new districts, as I think we should lose no opportunity of perpetuating the nomenclature of a fast disappearing race, apart from which the liability of duplicating names is largely increased if the surnames of individuals are devoted to land districts." Between 1902 and 1906, a considerable rush to gazette new districts was promoted by the desire to impress land agents in London — the Minister noted that "it will not hurt the State to show as few blanks as possible". Prior to the construction of the Trans-Australian Railway, the Eastern Division, which consists almost entirely of the Great Victoria and Great Sandy Deserts, did not contain any districts.

List of land districts
The list below represents a complete list of land districts, together with the division of which they are part and the year where they came into being — either through granting of locations prior to 1896, delineation in Department files between 1896 and 1898, or gazettal from 1899 onwards.

Counties 

Historically, there were 26 counties in the south-western part of the state, designated shortly after the Swan River Colony was founded in 1829. It was originally intended for these to be subdivided into hundreds and parishes in a manner similar to South Australia, but this did not occur, as the division/district system took precedence.

Beaufort County
Carnarvon County
Durham County
Glenelg County
Goderich County
Grantham County
Grey County
Hay County
Howick County
Kent County
Lanark County
Lansdowne County
Melbourne County
Minto County
Murray County
Nelson County
Peel County
Plantagenet County
Perth County
Stirling County
Sussex County
Twiss County
Victoria County
Wellington County
Wicklow County
York County

Notes

External links
National Library of Australia, Cadastral Maps
Index map of Western Australia 1909 showing land districts and land divisions

 
History of Western Australia
Cadastral divisions Western Australia
Cadastral divisions